The 1977 BC Lions finished in second place in the Western Conference with a 10–6 record. They appeared in the Western Final.

General Manager Bob Ackles started a complete shakeup of the organization by bringing Edmonton assistant Vic Rapp in as the 10th head coach on January 21.   
 
Ackles also recruited Jerry Tagge, who quarterbacked the two-time NCAA champion University of Nebraska and was a high first round draft choice of the Green Bay Packers.  Tagge, who never found success with Green Bay, was enticed to come up to Canada to resurrect his football career.  Tagge had a solid season throwing for 2787 yards but more importantly led the Lions to 10 victories and several last-minute heroics that earned the 1977 Lions the label the "Cardiac Kids".  Tagge was the western nominee for Outstanding Player, but lost out to running back JImmy Edwards of Hamilton for the Outstanding Player Award in the CFL.

Al Wilson finally won the Schenley award for Most Outstanding Offensive Lineman and receiver/return Leon Bright captured the Schenley Rookie award.

Rapp was named the Canadian Football League's Coach of the Year.

Tagge, Wilson and Bright were the 3 Lions selected to the CFL All-star team.

Offseason

CFL Draft

Roster

Preseason

Regular season

Season standings

Season schedule

Playoffs

West Semi-Final

West Final

Offensive leaders

Awards and records
CFL's Most Outstanding Offensive Lineman Award – Al Wilson (DE)
CFL's Most Outstanding Rookie Award – Leon Bright (WR)

1977 CFL All-Stars
QB – Jerry Tagge, CFL All-Star
WR- Leon Bright, CFL All-Star
C – Al Wilson, CFL All-Star

References

BC Lions seasons
1977 Canadian Football League season by team
1977 in British Columbia